CNBM may refer to:
 China National Building Material Company, a Chinese company engaged in building products and engineering service businesses
 Carbon Nutrient Balance Model, an ecological model